Bako Ratsifa (born 18 March 1964) is a Malagasy swimmer. She competed in two events at the 1980 Summer Olympics. She was the first woman to represent Madagascar at the Olympics.

She is the sister of Olympic swimmer Vola Hanta Ratsifandrihamanana (born 1970), who swam in the 1992 games in Barcelona.

References

1964 births
Living people
Malagasy female swimmers
Olympic swimmers of Madagascar
Swimmers at the 1980 Summer Olympics
Place of birth missing (living people)
African Games medalists in swimming
Competitors at the 1987 All-Africa Games
African Games gold medalists for Madagascar
African Games silver medalists for Madagascar
African Games bronze medalists for Madagascar